Self-hosting is the practice of running and maintaining a website or service using a private web server, instead of using a service outside of someone's own control. For example, someone wishing to write a blog could use hosted blog services. Alternatively, they could install content management system software on their own server to self-host their blog.

Motivation to do so could be as simple as saving costs by combining several services on a single machine or VPS instance, or in most cases the privacy benefits of being more in control -- or in complete control -- one's data and computing infrastructure. However, it could also be a hobby to people well-versed in technology.

Accordingly, there's also a sizeable hobbyist community around self-hosting, made up of hobbyists, technology professionals and privacy conscious individuals.

See also
 On-premises software

References

Internet hosting
Web hosting